Kalaiyur is a village in Ramanathapuram in Tamil Nadu, India. It is located 25 km towards north from Ramanathapuram and 9 km away from Paramakkudi. Kalaiyur is known as the Village of Cooks. The village was featured in History TV18's show OMG! Yeh Mera India - Season 2, hosted by Krishna Abhishek.

Demographics
The Kalaiyur has total 356 families residing in Kalaiyur. It has population of 1406 of which 712 are males and 694 are females as per 2011 Census of India. In 2011, literacy rate of Kalaiyur was 100% compared to 100% of Tamil Nadu. In male literacy stands at 100% and female literacy rate was 100%.

Sports
Kabaddi is the popular sport. The kalaiyur kabaddi team (karumalaiyan 7s kabaddi team, kalaiyur) is one of the best kabaddi team in ramanathapuram district.

References

Villages in Ramanathapuram district